SS Nick Stoner was a Liberty ship built in the United States during World War II. She was named after Nick Stoner, a hunter and trapper that served in the Continental Army during the American Revolution and later the United States Army during the War of 1812.

Construction
Nick Stoner was laid down on 12 May 1944, under a Maritime Commission (MARCOM) contract, MC hull 2307, by J.A. Jones Construction, Panama City, Florida; she was sponsored by Mrs. Eula Brown, and launched on 17 June 1944.

History
She was allocated to North Atlantic & Gulf Steamship Co., on 30 June 1944. On 11 June 1946, she was laid up in the National Defense Reserve Fleet, in Mobile, Alabama. On 14 May 1963, she was sold for $48,765.56 to Union Minerals and Alloys Corporation, to be scrapped. She was removed from the fleet on 17 June 1963.

References

Bibliography

 
 
 
 
 

 

Liberty ships
Ships built in Panama City, Florida
1944 ships
Mobile Reserve Fleet